The second season of the original Mission: Impossible originally aired Sundays at 10:00–11:00 pm (EST) on CBS from September 10, 1967 to March 17, 1968.

Cast

Episodes

References

2
1967 American television seasons
1968 American television seasons